Dr. T, Lone Star Vet is an American television series on the Nat Geo Wild network. It premiered on October 13, 2019, and follows Lauren Thielen, the titular Dr. T, and the veterinarians and staff of the Texas Avian & Exotic Animal Hospital located in Grapevine, Texas.

The show's Dr. T was previously featured on the Nat Geo Wild show titled Dr. K's Exotic Animal ER, before leaving to open her own clinic in her home state.

Cast 
Source:

Veterinarians 
Dr. Lauren Thielen, Diplomate ABVP (Avian Practice) ("Dr. T.")
Dr. Caeley Melmed, D.V.M., Internal Medicine
Dr. Bruce Nixon, D.V.M., Practice Manager 
Dr. Georgia Altom, D.V.M., Emergency Veterinarian
Dr. Tannetjė Crocker, Emergency Veterinarian
Dr. Alyssa Freeman, D.V.M., Emergency Veterinarian
Dr. Megan Turner, D.V.M., Chief of Medicine
Dr. Debra Nossaman, D.V.M., FAVD, DAVDC, Veterinary Dentist
Dr. Quentin Brands, D.V.M., Emergency Veterinarian
Dr. Nick Di Girolamo, D.V.M.
Dr. Libby Ramirez, D.V.M., Chief of Operations
Dr. Katherine Wells, D.V.M., Veterinary Surgeon
Dr. Jacqueline Gimmler, D.V.M., Veterinary Dermatologist

Veterinary staff 
 Maryanne Farmer, Lead Veterinary Technician
 Tonya Green, Veterinary Technician
 Hollie Hibbard, LVT, Veterinary Dentistry Technician
 Courtney Mixon, Veterinary Technician

Narrator 
 Chris Payne Gilbert

Episodes

Season 1 (2019)

References 

National Geographic (American TV channel) original programming
Nature educational television series
2019 American television series debuts
English-language television shows